Endasys subclavatus is a species of ichneumon wasp in the family Ichneumonidae. It is specifically a parasite of Neodiprion cocoons.

References

Parasitic wasps
Articles created by Qbugbot
Insects described in 1836